Kiyasovsky District (Kijasa joros) is an administrative and municipal district (raion), one of the twenty-five in the Udmurt Republic, Russia. It is located in the south of the republic. Its administrative center is the rural locality (a selo) of Kiyasovo. Population:  11,550 (2002 Census);  The population of Kiyasovo accounts for 31.1% of the district's total population.

References

Sources

Districts of Udmurtia